My Dark Places: An L.A. Crime Memoir is a 1996 book, part investigative journalism and part memoir, by American crime-fiction writer James Ellroy. Ellroy's mother Geneva was murdered in 1958, when he was 10 years old, and the killer was never identified. The book is Ellroy's account of his attempt to solve the mystery by hiring a retired Los Angeles County homicide detective to investigate the crime. Ellroy also explores how being directly affected by a crime shaped his life - often for the worse - and led him to write crime novels. The book is dedicated to his mother.

Summary 
Geneva Ellroy's strangled body was found by a roadside in El Monte, California. She was found by children in Babe Ruth baseball and their coaches on June 22, 1958. The road lay beside the playing field at Arroyo High School. Officers from the El Monte city police department handed over the investigation to the L.A. Sheriff’s Homicide Bureau. They chased down leads gathered from the scene and from anonymous tips sent in by area citizens. Newspaper accounts about the murder were scarce, as well as the television news accounts. There were three murders that had occurred in El Monte in 1958 by that time, and all had been resolved very quickly. After all the leads went dry, the case was eventually abandoned and never solved.

The murder of Geneva Ellroy (who was more commonly called Jean) later contributed to her son's fascination with another unsolved murder in Los Angeles: the January 15, 1947 murder of Elizabeth Short. This killing, later called the Black Dahlia case, had some similarities to Jean Ellroy's murder. Both had been body dumped by the roadside to be found by passersby. In his book, Ellroy describes the discovery of his mother’s body as a "classic late night body dump."

Jean Ellroy’s murder would not be remembered because it lacked the media attention that followed the Dahlia murder. Elizabeth Short’s body was found cut in half, and the newspaper accounts, which described Short as a beautiful Hollywood aspiring starlet, drew more interest and attention, including Ellroy's.

In The Black Dahlia, Ellroy created a fictional story around the murder of Elizabeth Short. In My Dark Places, Ellroy writes a true-crime memoir, chasing down the facts of his mother's murder as a cold case. Bill Stoner is the retired L.A. investigator who assisted Ellroy in his search for the killer. Ellroy had never seen the police file of his mother’s murder until he decided to write this book in the mid-1990s. After fifteen months of investigation, the crime remained unsolved, and any potential suspects are believed to be dead.

Continuing investigation
After the final page of the memoir, there is a page that allows information to be sent pertaining to the investigation. It states: "The investigation continues. Information on the case can be forwarded to Detective Stoner either through the toll-free number, 1-800-717-6517, or his e-mail address, detstoner@earthlink.net."

Critical reviews
The reviews for My Dark Places were quite positive. "Both a harrowing autobiography and a disturbingly fixed love story...blunt, graphic, and oddly exhilarating." —San Francisco Chronicle. "Strange and perversely fascinating....[My Dark Places] is part thriller, part screech of pain, part botched exorcism.... It is also a profoundly pessimistic meditation on the ubiquity of evil.... A candid chronicle of growing up weird under the sentence of unexpressed grief." —Newsday. "A dazzling memoir that reads half like a romance, half like the logbook for a homicide investigation.... My Dark Places is remarkable." —A. M. Homes, Bazaar. "A masterpiece.... Incredible, fascinating detail.... Ellroy is never anything but honest: All the scars are exposed... and best of all, it is all written in that familiar Ellroy style, each sentence like a finger jabbed in your chest.... This is a mesmerizing book." —Men's Journal. Ellroy's My Dark Places was a Time Best Book of the Year, as well as a New York Times Notable Book for 1996.

Publication history
Blakeney, Gloucestershire: Scorpion Press, 1996. Signed, limited edition.
London: Century Books, October 1996. First trade edition.
New York: Alfred A. Knopf, November 1996. First American edition.
For this edition, Ellroy signed (or rather initialed) 50,000 blank pages that were bound into each copy of the first printing.
London: Arrow, June 1997. First British trade paperback.
New York: Vintage, August 1997. First American trade paperback.

References

External links
 https://www.jamesellroy.net/

1996 non-fiction books
American biographies
Non-fiction novels of investigative journalism
Non-fiction novels about murders in the United States
Literary memoirs
Books by James Ellroy
American autobiographies
Century (imprint) books
Works about the Black Dahlia case